Lulli is a 2021 Brazilian comedy-drama film directed by César Rodrigues, written by Renato Fagundes and Thalita Rebouças and starring Larissa Manoela.

Plot
Lulli is an ambitious medical student whose greatest dream is to become the best surgeon, the goal failed when she is electrocuted by an electromagnetic resonance device that awakens her ability to hear other people's thoughts about Lulli.

Cast 
 Larissa Manoela as Lulli Flores
 Vinícius Redd as Diego Andrade
 Amanda de Godoi as Vanessa
 Yara Charry as Elena
 Sergio Malheiros as Julio
 Nicolas Ahnert as Ricardo
 Luciana Braga as Miriam Flores
 Paula Possani as Dr. Paola
 Guilherme Fontes as Dr. César Andrade 
 Marcos Breda as Oscar
 Thalita Rebouças as Romina
 Ana Mangueth as Dolores
 Gabriel Contente as Roberto

References

External links 
 
 

2021 films
2021 comedy-drama films
Brazilian comedy-drama films
2020s Portuguese-language films
Portuguese-language Netflix original films